The 2013 Final Four Men's Volleyball Cup was the first edition of the annual men's volleyball tournament, played by four countries from November 6–9, 2013 in Monterrey, Mexico. Mexico won the event with the Dominican Republic in second place and Canada won the bronze over the fourth place, Venezuela. The Mexican Tomás Aguilera was awarded Most Valuable Player.

Competing Nations

Round robin

Final

Final standing

Awards

Most Valuable Player
  Tomás Aguilera
Best Scorer
  Henry Tapia
Best Spiker
  Jesús Valdez
Best Blocker
  Samuel Cordón
Best Server
  Elnis Palomino
Best Setter
  Pedro Rangel
Best Libero
  Marshall Douglas
Best Receiver
  Héctor Salerno
Best Libero
  Edwin Peguero

References

NORCECA

F